Bistorta griffithii is a species of flowering plant in the family Polygonaceae, native to Tibet, East Himalaya, South-Central China and Myanmar.

Taxonomy

Bistorta griffithii was first described in 1886 by Joseph Dalton Hooker as Polygonum griffithii. It was transferred to the genus Bistorta in 1982 by Andrew Grierson.

References

griffithii
Flora of East Himalaya
Flora of Myanmar
Flora of South-Central China
Flora of Tibet
Plants described in 1886